GetYou is an iOS and Android application that enables users to find out how people around the world perceive them and their characteristics at first glance.

Application 
GetYou is the first full social feedback platform that shows how people perceive others, their content and online persona and aggregates feedback to create a crowdsourced profile built by others. This new type of feedback and profile add a new dimension of search capabilities. The application functions through a mobile game that uses semi-anonymous feedback mechanisms. The app presents a member's picture, upon which a user answers a series of questions. Results are analysed and presented, allowing the displayed member to discover people's perceptions of his or her personality traits, occupation, age and other feedback. With GetYou it is possible to look for people and content that is funny and smart, find people in relevant networks, and discover new content and individuals for different personality aspects. The app was launched on July 8, 2014.

History 
The company is based in Israel and was founded by Orit Mossinson who said "the goal here is to bridge first impression gaps.” The company raised $1.1 million in seed funding from venture capital firm RDSeed and angel investors, including Wix founder Avishai Abrahami. Technology commentators describe the app as a combination between the apps Tinder and Secret.

References 

Application software
Android (operating system) software
IOS software